The Mek are a Papuan people living in Dirwemna and Puldama, Yahukimo Regency, Highland Papua, Indonesia. They are closely related to Ketengban people in Pegunungan Bintang Regency.

A television series on The Discovery Channel titled Living with the Mek was aired in 2008.

See also

Indigenous people of New Guinea

References

External links
Photos from the Mek tribal area

Ethnic groups in Indonesia
Indigenous ethnic groups in Western New Guinea
Uncontacted peoples